The men's team free rifle at 300 metres was one of 15 events on the shooting at the 1908 Summer Olympics programme. The competition was held on Thursday, 9 July 1908 and was extended after sunset to Friday, 10 July 1908 — it was the first shooting event of the Games. Fifty-four sport shooters from nine nations competed. The event was won by the team from Norway, improving on their second-place finish in 1900. Sweden made its debut in the event, taking silver. France repeated as bronze medalists. 

Ole Sæther was the first man to earn multiple medals in the event, having been on the 1900 Norwegian team as well as this year's squad.

Background

This was the second appearance of the men's 300 metre team rifle event, which was held 4 times between 1900 and 1920. 

The teams used different rifles. France shot with a Swiss Martini; Denmark used a Crag-Jørgensen; Greece and the Netherlands shot with a Mannlicher; Sweden used a government-issue Mauser; and Finland shot with a Mofferd. Norway used private match rifles. Due to winds blowing against the players, teams with light rifles faced more difficulty.

Reigning Olympic champions Switzerland did not return. Finland, Great Britain, Greece, and Sweden each made their debut in the event. Belgium, Denmark, France, the Netherlands, and Norway each made their second appearance.

Competition format

The competition had each shooter fire 120 shots, 40 shots in each of three positions: prone, kneeling, and standing. The target was 1 metre in diameter, with 10 scoring rings; targets were set at a distance of 300 metres. The six team members' scores were then summed. Thus, the maximum score possible was 7200 points. The scores for the team event were separate from the individual event this time.

Schedule

Results

Teams consisted of six shooters, with each shooter firing 120 shots at the target 300 metres distant. 40 shots were fired from each of three positions—standing, kneeling, and prone. A bulls-eye counted for 10 points, and thus the highest possible score for each shooter was 1200 points, with the team maximum being 7200.

References

External links
 
 

Men's rifle free team 0300 metre
Men's 300m team